The First State Bank in Edna, Kansas is a Classical Revival-style bank built in 1887.  It was listed on the National Register of Historic Places in 1982.  It is located at the southwest corner of Delaware and Main Streets in Edna.

References

Bank buildings on the National Register of Historic Places in Kansas
Neoclassical architecture in Kansas
Commercial buildings completed in 1887
Labette County, Kansas